{{DISPLAYTITLE:C5H13NO}}
The molecular formula C5H13NO (molar mass: 103.16 g/mol, exact mass: 103.0997 u) may refer to:

 Dimethylaminoisopropanol
 Neurine
 Valinol